Sharon Purcell is a fictional character in the television drama Peyton Place. She was portrayed by Dayna Ceder. She appeared in 6 episodes in 1965.

Character history
Sharon first met Betty Anderson at an employment agency in New York City. She noticed Betty could need a friend and offered to live with her at the apartment of her older and rich married man. They spend their time buying expensive clothes with the money of the man she has an affair with. She admits to Betty she feels lonely a lot when he is with his family.

At one point, Sharon persuades her to go to a party with her. Their dates are older men and Betty's date tries to take advantage of her. She cries and decides to leave town. Sharon and Betty here part and there is never heard of Sharon again.

Peyton Place characters
Television characters introduced in 1965